The 1986–87 NBA season was the Detroit Pistons' 39th season in the NBA and 30th season in the city of Detroit.  The team played at the Pontiac Silverdome in surburban Pontiac, Michigan.

The disappointing finish of the previous year caused a roster shake-up as the team dealt Earl Cureton to the Chicago Bulls for Sidney Green, Kent Benson and Kelly Tripucka to the Utah Jazz for Adrian Dantley, and guard John Long to the Seattle SuperSonics for draft picks.  The team added John Salley and Dennis Rodman in the 1986 NBA Draft to complete the turnover.  The moves by GM "Trader Jack" McCloskey paid immediate dividends as the team finished 52–30 (.634), 2nd in the Central Division.  The team advanced to the playoffs, defeating the Washington Bullets 3–0 in the first round and then the Atlanta Hawks 4–1 to advance to the Eastern Conference finals against the Boston Celtics.  

The tightly contested conference finals went to a 7th game  thanks to Celtics star Larry Bird when he made an improbable steal in the closing seconds of Game 5 to keep the Boston season alive.  Leading by 1 point, Pistons star Isiah Thomas waived off a timeout request from Pistons coach Chuck Daly, hurried a lofting inbound pass to center Bill Laimbeer, as Bird stepped in for the steal, passing to teammate Dennis Johnson for the 108–107 Boston win.  Long-time Celtic announcer Johnny Most’s call of Bird’s game-saving steal in the 1987 playoffs at the end of Game 5 in the Eastern Conference finals vs. Detroit was memorable with "Aaaaaaand now there’s a steal by Bird, underneath to DEE-Jay, he lays it in…and Boston has a one-point lead right with one second to go… What a play by Bird!...Oh my this place is goin’ crazy!”  After a Pistons home win in Game 6, the series returned to the Boston Garden for the 7th game with the Celtics holding off Detroit 117–114 for the series victory.  

Detroit was led on the season by guard Thomas (20.6 ppg, 10.0 apg, NBA All-Star), center Laimbeer (15.4 ppg, 11.6 rpg, NBA All-Star), and forward Dantley (21.5 ppg).

Draft picks

Roster

Regular season

Season standings

z – clinched division title
y – clinched division title
x – clinched playoff spot

Record vs. opponents

Playoffs

|- align="center" bgcolor="#ccffcc"
| 1
| April 24
| Washington
| W 106–92
| Isiah Thomas (34)
| Laimbeer, Rodman (10)
| Isiah Thomas (9)
| Pontiac Silverdome15,419
| 1–0
|- align="center" bgcolor="#ccffcc"
| 2
| April 26
| Washington
| W 128–85
| Adrian Dantley (24)
| Bill Laimbeer (9)
| Vinnie Johnson (13)
| Pontiac Silverdome14,389
| 2–0
|- align="center" bgcolor="#ccffcc"
| 3
| April 29
| @ Washington
| W 97–96
| Dantley, Johnson (21)
| Rick Mahorn (12)
| Isiah Thomas (10)
| Capital Centre10,831
| 3–0
|-

|- align="center" bgcolor="#ccffcc"
| 1
| May 3
| @ Atlanta
| W 112–111
| Isiah Thomas (30)
| Dennis Rodman (10)
| Isiah Thomas (10)
| Omni Coliseum14,361
| 1–0
|- align="center" bgcolor="#ffcccc"
| 2
| May 5
| @ Atlanta
| L 102–115
| Laimbeer, Rodman (20)
| Bill Laimbeer (12)
| Isiah Thomas (6)
| Omni Coliseum16,522
| 1–1
|- align="center" bgcolor="#ccffcc"
| 3
| May 8
| Atlanta
| W 108–99
| Isiah Thomas (35)
| Dennis Rodman (9)
| Isiah Thomas (8)
| Pontiac Silverdome24,544
| 2–1
|- align="center" bgcolor="#ccffcc"
| 4
| May 10
| Atlanta
| W 89–88
| Isiah Thomas (31)
| Rick Mahorn (17)
| Joe Dumars (5)
| Pontiac Silverdome17,269
| 3–1
|- align="center" bgcolor="#ccffcc"
| 5
| May 13
| @ Atlanta
| W 104–96
| Joe Dumars (21)
| Rick Mahorn (16)
| Isiah Thomas (12)
| Omni Coliseum16,522
| 4–1
|-

|- align="center" bgcolor="#ffcccc"
| 1
| May 19
| @ Boston
| L 91–104
| Isiah Thomas (18)
| Rick Mahorn (11)
| Isiah Thomas (10)
| Boston Garden14,890
| 0–1
|- align="center" bgcolor="#ffcccc"
| 2
| May 21
| @ Boston
| L 101–110
| Isiah Thomas (36)
| Bill Laimbeer (16)
| Bill Laimbeer (7)
| Boston Garden14,890
| 0–2
|- align="center" bgcolor="#ccffcc"
| 3
| May 23
| Boston
| W 122–104
| Adrian Dantley (25)
| Rick Mahorn (12)
| Vinnie Johnson (8)
| Pontiac Silverdome23,525
| 1–2
|- align="center" bgcolor="#ccffcc"
| 4
| May 24
| Boston
| W 145–119
| Adrian Dantley (32)
| Bill Laimbeer (13)
| Thomas, Dumars (8)
| Pontiac Silverdome27,387
| 2–2
|- align="center" bgcolor="#ffcccc"
| 5
| May 26
| @ Boston
| L 107–108
| Adrian Dantley (25)
| Bill Laimbeer (14)
| Isiah Thomas (11)
| Boston Garden14,890
| 2–3
|- align="center" bgcolor="#ccffcc"
| 6
| May 28
| Boston
| W 113–105
| Dantley, Johnson (24)
| Rick Mahorn (18)
| Isiah Thomas (9)
| Pontiac Silverdome28,383
| 3–3
|- align="center" bgcolor="#ffcccc"
| 7
| May 30
| @ Boston
| L 114–117
| Joe Dumars (35)
| Bill Laimbeer (13)
| Isiah Thomas (9)
| Boston Garden14,890
| 3–4
|-

Awards and records
Isiah Thomas, All-NBA Second Team

References

See also
1986-87 NBA season

Detroit Pistons seasons
Detroit
Detroit Pistons
Detroit Pistons